7 Virgins is a 2005 Spanish crime film directed by Alberto Rodríguez which stars Juan José Ballesta and Jesús Carroza.

Plot 
Tano, a jailed teenager, gets a 48-hour release to attend his brother's wedding. When 16-year-old Tano gets out, he meets up with his best friend, Richi. In the 48 hours, he does everything he is not supposed to do, without a care in the world. At the end of the two days, he realizes everything in his life has changed and it has matured him.

It is set in Seville.

Cast

Production 
The screenplay was penned by Rodríguez and Rafael Cobos. The film is a Tesela PC and La Zanfoña Producciones production. It was shot in Seville in 2004.

Accolades 

|-
| align = "center" rowspan = "7" | 2006 || rowspan = "6" | 20th Goya Awards || colspan = "2" | Best Film ||  || rowspan = "6" | 
|-
| Best Director || Alberto Rodríguez || 
|-
| Best Original Screenplay || Rafael Cobos, Alberto Rodríguez || 
|-
| Best Actor || Juan José Ballesta || 
|-
| Best New Actor || Jesús Carroza || 
|-
| Best New Actress || Alba Rodríguez || 
|-
| 15th Actors and Actresses Union Awards || Best New Actor || Jesús Carroza ||  || 
|}

Release 
The film was theatrically released in Spain on 14 October 2005.

See also 
 List of Spanish films of 2005

References

External links 

2000s crime films
Spanish drama films
2000s Spanish-language films
Films directed by Alberto Rodríguez Librero
Spanish crime films
Films set in Seville
Films shot in the province of Seville
2000s Spanish films